"The Flying Saucer" (also known as "The Flying Saucer Parts 1 & 2") is a novelty record, the first of a series of break-in records released by Bill Buchanan and Dickie Goodman (credited simply as "Buchanan & Goodman"). The song is considered to be an early (perhaps the earliest) example of a mashup, featuring segments of popular songs intertwined with spoken "news" commentary to tell the story of a visit from a flying saucer.

Bill Buchanan plays the radio announcer, stating that the spacemen are attacking Earth.  Dickie Goodman plays reporter John Cameron-Cameron (a play on the broadcaster John Cameron Swayze). Goodman would re-visit this character in several other 'Flying Saucer' records.

Structure
The song uses clips from 17 different songs, each of which was a top 20 hit in 1955 or 1956. In order of occurrence:

 Side One
 "Open Up That Door" by Nappy Brown (saxophone intro only)
 "The Great Pretender" by The Platters (referenced as "Too Real" by The Clatters)
 "I Want You to Be My Girl" by The Teenagers featuring Frankie Lymon
 "Long Tall Sally" by Little Richard
 "Poor Me" by Fats Domino
 "Heartbreak Hotel" by Elvis Presley
 "Earth Angel" by The Penguins (referenced as "Earth" by The Pelicans)
 "I Hear You Knocking" by Smiley Lewis (referenced as "Knocking" by Laughing Lewis)
 "Tutti Frutti" by Little Richard
 "(You've Got) The Magic Touch" by The Platters (referenced as "Uh-Oh" by The Clatters)
 "The Great Pretender" by The Platters
 Side Two
 "Band of Gold" by Don Cherry
 "Ain't That A Shame" by Fats Domino (referenced as "That's A Shame" by Skinny Dynamo)
 "Band of Gold" by Don Cherry (again)
 "Don't Be Angry" by Nappy Brown
 "Blue Suede Shoes" by Carl Perkins (referenced as "Shoes" by Pa Gherkins)
 "Maybellene" by Chuck Berry (referenced as "The Motor Cooled Down" by Huckle Berry)
 "See You Later Alligator" by Bill Haley & His Comets
 "My Prayer" by The Platters

Release and reception 
Its wide use of "sampling" prompted music publishers to file suit against Buchanan and Goodman in July (1956). The two men were also criticized in media of the era, with an anonymous source telling Billboard, "If we can't stop this nothing is safe in our business." While "The Flying Saucer" was not the first record to quote from famous songs (see "Cool Whalin'" by Babs Gonzales), it was the first popular record to sample directly from the records themselves. The comedians made fun of their own predicament by issuing a follow-up song, "Buchanan and Goodman on Trial" (Luniverse 102). By November, 1956, the novelty song had stood up in court, being labeled as artful and clever. A judge refused to issue an injunction prohibiting the sales of the record. Essentially, the record was considered a new work. This made it legal for artists to sample existing records—a practice that became very popular in subsequent years.

Charts

References

External links 
 
 

1956 singles
1956 songs
Dickie Goodman songs
Break-in records
Songs about extraterrestrial life
Sampling controversies
UFO culture